Queendom Final Comeback (stylized as "Queendom <FINAL Comeback>") is an EP by Queendom contestants of the South Korean survival show Queendom. It was released online for download on October 25, 2019, by Stone Music Entertainment.

Background
Queendom is a South Korean survival show that aired on Mnet. The program is a comeback battle between six trending girl group acts, in order to "determine the real number one" when all six release their songs at the same time.

On the 10th episode, Final Live Comeback Stages, the teams will each perform a newly produced song live from different producers, with different genres. 

"Destiny" was later included in Mamamoo's second Korean studio album Reality in Black, released on November 14, 2019. 

"Sorry" was later included in AOA's sixth mini-album New Moon released on November 26, 2019. 

"Wanna Go Back" was later released alongside Park Bom's single First Snow, on December 10, 2019.

"Guerilla" was later included in Oh My Girl's third Japanese studio album Eternally, released on January 8, 2020.

"Lion" was later included in (G)I-dle's third mini-album I Trust, released on April 6, 2020.

Track listing

Release history

Notes

References

2019 compilation albums
2019 EPs
K-pop EPs
Korean-language compilation albums